Kazachye is a rural locality (a selo) in Prokhorovsky District, Belgorod Oblast, Russia. The population was 127 as of 2010. There are 5 streets.

Geography 
Kazachye is located 35 km southeast of Prokhorovka (the district's administrative centre) by road. Kurakovka is the nearest rural locality.

References 

Rural localities in Prokhorovsky District